The 1946 North Carolina College Eagles football team was an American football team that represented North Carolina College in the Colored Intercollegiate Athletic Association (CIAA) during the 1946 college football season. In their second season under head coach Herman Riddick, the Eagles compiled a 7–3 record (5–3 against CIAA opponents) and outscored all opponents by a total of 230 to 55.

The Dickinson System rated North Carolina College in a tie for No. 16 among the black college football teams for 1946.

Schedule

References

North Carolina College
North Carolina Central Eagles football seasons
North Carolina College Eagles football